Platte Lake or Lake Platte may refer to:

Platte Lake (Michigan), a lake in Benzie County, Michigan
Platte Lake (Minnesota), a lake in Minnesota
Lake Platte (South Dakota), a lake in Charles Mix County, South Dakota
Platte Lake (South Dakota), a lake in Aurora County, South Dakota

See also
Platte Lake Township, Crow Wing County, Minnesota